Secret Evidence is a 1941 American drama film. Directed by William Nigh, the film stars Marjorie Reynolds, Charles Quigley, and Ward McTaggart. It was released on January 31, 1941.

Cast
 Marjorie Reynolds as Linda Wilson
 Charles Quigley as David Harrison
 Ward McTaggart as Tony Baxter
 Howard Masters as Jerry Wilson
 Bob White as Sniffy
 Kenneth Harlan as Frank Billings
 Donald Curtis as Murphy
 Charles Phipps as Father
 Dorothy Vaughan as Mother
 Budd Buster as Frank

References

External links
 
 

American black-and-white films
American drama films
1941 drama films
1941 films
Producers Releasing Corporation films
Films directed by William Nigh
1940s English-language films
1940s American films